The World Cadets and Juniors Fencing Championships are an annual international fencing competition held by the International Fencing Federation.

History
Junior World Fencing Championships for athletes up to 20 years old. Also at the same time and venue as the Cadet World Fencing Championships held for athletes up to 17 years old.

The first Junior World Fencing Championships were held in Nîmes, France in 1950. Team events have been held since 1998. Women compete in foil since 1955, in épée since 1989, and in sabre since 1999.

The first Cadet World Fencing Championships were held in Tel Aviv, Israel in 1987 (Cadets without team events).

Cadet World Fencing Championships and Junior World Fencing Championships were held in two different countries from 1987 to 1992. They have been held simultaneously in one country since 1993.

Share bronze medals in individuals events awarded from 1991.

Other Names
 World Cadet and Junior Fencing Championships
 World Junior and Cadet Fencing Championships
 Junior and Cadet World Fencing Championships
 Cadet and Junior World Fencing Championships
 World Juniors Fencing Championships
 World Cadets Fencing Championships

Ages
 17 to 20 : Juniors from 1950
 14 to 17 : Cadets from 1987

Events
 Foil MJ : From 1950 (Team events have been held since 1998)
 Foil WJ : From 1955 (Team events have been held since 1998)
 Epee MJ : From 1956 (Team events have been held since 1998)
 Epee WJ : From 1989 (Team events have been held since 1998)
 Sabre MJ : From 1952 (Team events have been held since 1998)
 Saber WJ : From 1999 (Team events have been held since 1999)
 Foil MC : From 1987 (No Team events)
 Foil WC : From 1987 (No Team events)
 Epee MC : From 1987 (No Team events)
 Epee WC : From 1990 (No Team events)
 Sabre MC : From 1987 (No Team events)
 Saber WC : From 1999 (No Team events)

 Note: M=Men / W=Women / J=Juniors / C=Cadets

All Medalists (1950-2009)

You can create (extinct) and complete this article with two below source:

 https://web.archive.org/web/20160810015343/https://www.kardolus.org/downloads/palmaresfie.pdf - Medalist 1950 to 2009
 https://web.archive.org/web/20180720165826/https://www.fencing.net/downloads/World%20Championships%20and%20Olympics%20-%20Medalists%20by%20name.pdf

Summary

 Not held in 2020.

See also
 World Fencing Championships
 European Cadets and Juniors Fencing Championships
 Asian Cadets and Juniors Fencing Championships

References

Results
 https://web.archive.org/web/20170702002849/https://fie.org/results-statistic/result
 https://web.archive.org/web/20180720165826/https://www.fencing.net/downloads/World%20Championships%20and%20Olympics%20-%20Medalists%20by%20name.pdf
 https://web.archive.org/web/20160810015343/https://www.kardolus.org/downloads/palmaresfie.pdf - Medalist 1950 to 2009

External links
 Results at the International Fencing Federation
 http://www.sport-komplett.de/sport-komplett/sportarten/index_sportarten.htm
 https://www.the-sports.org/fencing-world-cadet-championships-statistics-sups8321.html
 https://www.the-sports.org/fencing-world-junior-championships-statistics-sups4951.html
 https://web.archive.org/web/20160424181636/https://www.federscherma.it/la-scherma/curricula-atleti/fioretto-femminile/12618-trillini-giovanna/file

 
Fencing competitions
Fencing
Recurring sporting events established in 1950